Fête galante or Fêtes galantes is a genre of painting depicting the festive amusements of 18th century French aristocrats. 

Fête galante may also refer to:

Music
Fête Galante (Smyth), opera by Ethel Smyth
Fête Galante (Schierbeck), opera by Poul Schierbeck
Fête Galante, ballet choreographed by Ib Andersen
Fete Galante, composition for wind orchestra by Joseph Horovitz
Fête galante and collections Fêtes galantes Sets 1 and 2, compositions by Claude Debussy for voice and piano 
Fêtes galantes, composition by Reine Colaço Osorio-Swaab
Fêtes galantes, a composition by Reynaldo Hahn for voice and piano
Fêtes galantes, a composition by Francis Poulenc for voice 
Fêtes galantes, two compositions by Willem Pijper for voice

Other
Fêtes galantes, book by Paul Kenis
Fêtes galantes, poetry collection by Paul Verlaine
Les fêtes galantes, film directed by René Clair